is a train station on the Nichinan Line in Miyazaki City, Miyazaki Prefecture, Japan, operated by JR Kyushu.

Lines

Station layout
The station is unstaffed and consists of one side platform and one island platform serving three tracks. The platforms are connected by a level crossing for passengers to cross the tracks.

Adjacent stations

History
The station closed when the Miyazaki Railway ceased operations on 1 July 1962. Subsequently, Japanese National Railways (JNR) extended its then Shibushi Line north from  towards Minami-Miyazaki on the same route and reopened Aoshima as an intermediate station on 8 May 1963. With the privatization of JNR on 1 April 1987, the station came under the control of JR Kyushu.

The station became unstaffed from 1 December 1992.

Passenger statistics
In fiscal 2006, Aoshima Station was used by an average of 58 passengers daily (boarding passengers only),. In fiscal 2016, the daily average for boarding passengers had grown slightly to 62.

Surrounding area

 Aoshima Island
 Aoshima Subtropical Botanical Garden
 Aoshima Shrine
 Aoshima Beach
 Aoshima Onsen hot spring resort
 National Route 220

See also
 List of railway stations in Japan

References

External links
Aoshima (JR Kyushu)

Stations of Kyushu Railway Company
Railway stations in Miyazaki Prefecture
Railway stations in Japan opened in 1913
Miyazaki (city)